The 195th Army Division(2nd Formation) was created in December 1969 basing on the 4th Engineer District, Engineer Troops of Beijing Military Region.

The division was part of 65th Army Corps. By then the division was composed of:
583rd Infantry Regiment;
584th Infantry Regiment;
585th Infantry Regiment;
Artillery Regiment.

The division was disbanded in 1985 and re-organized as Tank Brigade, 65th Army. In 1998 it renamed as Armored Brigade, 65th Army. In 2003 the brigade was disbanded and replaced by 1st Armored Division.

References

中国人民解放军各步兵师沿革，http://blog.sina.com.cn/s/blog_a3f74a990101cp1q.html

Infantry divisions of the People's Liberation Army
Military units and formations established in 1969
Military units and formations disestablished in 1985